Cláudia de Paula Costa Magalhães (born 27 January 1962) is a Brazilian gymnast. She competed in five events at the 1980 Summer Olympics.

References

External links
 

1962 births
Living people
Brazilian female artistic gymnasts
Olympic gymnasts of Brazil
Gymnasts at the 1980 Summer Olympics
Pan American Games bronze medalists for Brazil
Pan American Games medalists in gymnastics
South American Games gold medalists for Brazil
South American Games medalists in gymnastics
Sportspeople from Rio de Janeiro (city)
Competitors at the 1983 Pan American Games
Medalists at the 1983 Pan American Games
21st-century Brazilian women
20th-century Brazilian women